Rockaway Courthouse is a historic courthouse located in the Rockaway Beach neighborhood of Queens County, New York. It was built in 1931, and is a three-story plus basement, steel frame and limestone, "V"-shaped building in the Classical Revival style. It consists of a tall central core with flanking courtroom wings. The front facade features an ornate Greek style entrance portico.  It served as a local Municipal and Magistrate's Court and was last used as a civic building in 1962.

It was listed on the National Register of Historic Places in 2014. Today the building is being reconstructed as a medical center.

References

Courthouses on the National Register of Historic Places in New York City
Neoclassical architecture in New York (state)
Government buildings completed in 1931
Government buildings in Queens, New York
National Register of Historic Places in Queens, New York